The 1986–87 Argentine Primera B Nacional was the 1st season of the newly created professional second division of Argentine football. This was the result of new changes in the entire Argentine football league system, the Metropolitano and Nacional of Primera División disappeared and the previous second division, the Primera B Metropolitana became the third division.

The division was formed by 7 teams from Primera B Metro (the best placed teams from a tournament played previously), 13 teams from regional leagues outside Buenos Aires and 2 teams relegated from Primera División in the 1985–86 season. A total of 22 teams competed, with the champion and runner-up being promoted to Primera División.

Deportivo Armenio won the championship, promoting to Primera along with Banfield (winner of "Torneo Octogonal"). On the other hand, Central Norte (Salta), Atlético Concepción (Banda del Río Salí, Tucumán), and Unión of Villa Krause (San Juan) were relegated to Primera B Metropolitana.

Club information

1: Property of Huracán Corrientes.

Standings
Deportivo Armenio was declared champion and was automatically promoted to Primera División, and the teams placed 2nd to 9th qualified for the Second Promotion Playoff.

Second Promotion Playoff
The Second Promotion Playoff or Torneo Reducido was played by the teams placed 2nd to 9th in the overall standings: Banfield (2nd), Belgrano (3rd), Huracán (4th), Colón (5th), Deportivo Maipú (6th), Deportivo Mandiyú (7th), Chaco For Ever (8th) and Lanús (9th). The winner was promoted to Primera División.

Bracket

1: Qualified because of sport advantage.

Relegation

1: They kept the points earned in previous editions of the Primera B Metropolitana, although the category was new.

2: They had to play a tiebreaker triangular to see which team was relegated.

Note: Clubs with indirect affiliation with AFA are relegated to their respective league of his province according to the Argentine football league system, while clubs directly affiliated face relegation to Primera B Metropolitana. Clubs with direct affiliation are all from Greater Buenos Aires, with the exception of Newell's, Rosario Central, Central Córdoba and Argentino de Rosario, all from Rosario, and Unión and Colón from Santa Fe.

Additional Playoff
Chacarita Juniors, Gimnasia y Esgrima (J) and Central Norte were tied in points, they had to play a tiebreaker triangular in a neutral field to see which team was relegated.

As the 3 matches ended in a tie, it was used the overall table and the matches between the 3 teams and Central Norte was the team with less points, so it was relegated to the Liga Salteña de fútbol.

Top scorers

See also
1986–87 in Argentine football

References

Primera B Nacional seasons 
Prim
1986 in South American football leagues
1987 in South American football leagues